This is a '''list of universities in Djibouti.

Universities in Djibouti
Université de Djibouti
Atlantic African Oriental Multicultural (ATAFOM) University

References

External links
Universities in Djibouti

Education in Djibouti
Djibouti
Djibouti

Universities